The West Coast Hockey Conference (WCHC) is an ACHA Division 2 club hockey league which began play in the Fall of 2010. The six charter schools were Arizona State, Cal State Fullerton, Long Beach State, Loyola Marymount, Northern Arizona and San Diego State.

History
The first game in conference history was played on October 1, 2010. San Diego State hosted Long Beach State and won 4-3. At the end of the regular season Arizona State was crowned the conference's first champion. For the conference's second season and beyond a playoff will be held to determine the conference champion.

UNLV became the seventh member of the conference on April 16, 2011. 

After the 2011-12 season Arizona State, San Diego State and UNLV became independent once again leaving the conference with four teams for the next two seasons.

Cal State Northridge became the fifth member of the conference on February 25, 2014.

Northern Arizona left to become independent once again after the 2014-15 season and Arizona State's Pac-8 team transferred over to keep the conference membership at five.

Arizona State left to become independent after one season and San Diego State rejoined the conference for 2016-17. 

Chapman became the sixth conference member for the 2017-18 season. 

The WCHC announced on May 14, 2018 UC San Diego, UC Santa Barbara and the University of San Diego were approved as members and San Diego State left to join the Pac-8 conference bringing the conference total to eight.

The conference reached a new high in members with the addition of Cal State Bakersfield and UC Irvine for the 2019-20 season. In an effort to even out the skill level two tiers were created. Cal State Fullerton, Cal State Northridge, Long Beach State, Loyola Marymount and UC Santa Barbara were placed in the top tier with the remaining five teams placed in the second tier. All top tier teams automatically qualified for the playoffs and the top two teams in the second tier qualified as well.

Cal Lutheran became a new member for the 2020-21 season while UC San Diego left the conference. CLU replaced UCSD in tier II keeping total membership at ten.

After the 2021-22 season the WCHC expanded even further with Arizona State and Northern Arizona rejoining the conference and Grand Canyon, Santa Clara, Santa Rosa Junior College, UC Davis, UCLA and UC Santa Cruz becoming new members. San Diego also left which brought membership to a record 17 schools. With so many new schools the WCHC was divided into three tiers. Tier I consisted of six teams Arizona State, Grand Canyon, Long Beach State, Loyola Marymount, Northern Arizona and UCLA. Tier II South consisted of seven teams Cal Lutheran, Cal State Bakersfield, Cal State Fullerton, Cal State Northridge, Chapman, UC Irvine and UC Santa Barbara. Tier II North consisted of four teams Santa Clara, Santa Rosa Junior College, UC Davis and UC Santa Cruz.

Members

Former members

Team Histories
Cal Lutheran started their program in the mid-1980s and played in the Pacific Collegiate Hockey Association until disbanding in the mid-1990s. CLU re-established their program in 2013.
CSU Bakersfield started their program in 2018.
Cal State Fullerton also previously played in the PCHA until disbanding in 2005. The Titans re-established their program for the 2008-09 season, played that year in Division 3 and then moved up to Division 2 for the 2009-10 season.
Cal State Northridge founded the PCHA in 1972 along with UCLA and Cal Tech. The Matadors moved up to Division 2 for the 2012-13 season after making the Division 3 National Tournament in 2010 and 2012.
Chapman started their program in 2010. The Panthers moved up to Division 2 for the 2014-15 season.
Long Beach State also previously played in the PCHA. In the late 1990s The Beach moved up to Division 2.
Loyola Marymount originally had a team from 1930 to 1942. The Lions re-established their program in 2006.
UC Irvine also previously played in the PCHA until disbanding in 2010. The Anteaters re-established their program for the 2019-20 season.
UC Santa Barbara started their program in 2010. The Gauchos also previously played in the PCHA.

Tournament Champions

Note: 2022 tournament cancelled

ACHA Division 2 Nationals Teams
The WCHC has sent five teams to the Division 2 National Tournament.

2016 Host City: West Chester, PA

Arizona State-Maroon

Liberty (L 4-1)

William Paterson (L 5-1)

Lindenwood (L 9-1)

2015 Host City: Salt Lake City, UT

Northern Arizona

NYU (L 3-1)

Liberty (W 5-2)

Grand Valley State (L 7-2)

2014 Host City: Marlborough, MA

Northern Arizona (Finished 9th)

New Hampshire (L 3-1)

Liberty (L 6-2)

Grand Valley State (W 6-2)

2012 Host City: Fort Myers, FL

Arizona State (Finished 5th)

New Hampshire (W 7-1)

Maryland-Baltimore County (W 5-4 OT)

Michigan State (T 2-2)

Northern Arizona (Finished 16th)

Grand Valley State (L 8-2)

Penn State (L 9-0)

Siena College (L 3-1)

References

See also
American Collegiate Hockey Association
List of ice hockey leagues

ACHA Division 2 conferences
2010 establishments in the United States